SNTV may refer to:

Single non-transferable vote, an electoral system in multi-member constituency elections
Sistema Nacional de Televisión (Nicaragua), the Nicaraguan state broadcaster from 1990–1997
Sistema Nacional de Televisión (Paraguay), a Paraguayan broadcaster
Société Nigérienne de Transports de Voyageurs, the Nigerien state transport company
Somali National Television (SNTV), the national television station of Somalia